Đăk Nông, also Ðắc Nông, is a province of Vietnam. It is located in the country's Central Highlands. The provincial capital is Gia Nghĩa.

Geography

Đắk Nông borders Đắk Lắk province in the north, Lâm Đồng province in the south-east, and Bình Phước province and Cambodia in the west. It is located in the southern part of the Central Highlands, about 500m above sea level. The terrain is lower in the west. Đắk Nông has large fields and lakes in the south. Đắk Nông has three main river systems: Ba River, Sêrêpôk River and other small rivers.

Climate

The average temperature is 24 degrees Celsius. The rainy season starts in May and ends in October. The dry season starts in November and ends in April the year after.

Economy

Like Đắk Lắk province, coffee, pepper and rubber are the most important products of Đắk Nông.
Đắk Nông is a potential province of tourism. There are many beautiful sites such as Ba Tang Waterfall, Diệu Thanh Waterfall, and Nâm Nung pine hill.

Administrative divisions
Đắk Nông is subdivided into eight district-level sub-divisions:

They are further subdivided into five commune-level towns (or townlets), 61 communes, and five wards.

History

Until recently, Đắk Nông was part of the larger Đắk Lắk province, but is now fully independent. Before 1975, Đắk Nông was part of South Vietnam (Republic of Vietnam) and was formerly named Quảng Đức Province. However, after the 1975 Việt Cộng victory and reunification with southern Vietnam in the Vietnam War, Quảng Đức was conjoined with Đắk Lắk Province. For Đắk Nông's history, please see Đắk Lắk province.

References

External links

 
Provinces of Vietnam